The men's middleweight event was part of the boxing programme at the 1920 Summer Olympics.  The weight class was the third-heaviest contested, and allowed boxers of up to 160 pounds (72.6 kilograms). The competition was held from August 21, 1920 to August 24, 1920. 17 boxers from nine nations competed.

Results

References

Sources
 
 

Middleweight